Simpson Township is an inactive township in Johnson County, in the U.S. state of Missouri.

Simpson Township was established in 1875, and named after James Simpson, a law enforcement agent.

References

Townships in Missouri
Townships in Johnson County, Missouri